Michael Irving is a stage and screen actor born on October, 19 1943 in Ipswich, Suffolk.

In 1972 he was one of the co-founders of the Half Moon Theatre with Maurice Colbourne and Guy Sprung. It became the Half Moon Young People's Theatre in 1990, a specialist theatre for young people. He performed in many productions there, including In the Jungle of the Cities, Will Wat, If Not, What Will?, Sawdust Caesar, Silver Tassie, Alkestis, The Mother and Female Transport. He directed and performed in Heroes of the Iceberg Hotel and Dan Dare (which he also wrote). In 1977 he played the Dame in Dick Whittington, or the City of Fear. In 2016 Michael became a patron of Half Moon Theatre (previously called Half Moon Young People's Theatre). This coincided with the launch of Stages of Half Moon, a digital archive of the theatre's history.

In the theatre, his work includes performance in the play "Apart from George"  and "Rough Music"   in London. He appeared in the film "Personal Services" (1987). He played a headmaster in an episode of The Bill. His played the father of Robert Pattinson's character in How To Be.

From 1971 to 1981 Michael was married to Veronica Hamel.

References

External links

Michael Irving on Stages of Half Moon

English male stage actors
English male film actors
Living people
Year of birth missing (living people)